Santa Barbara Surfing Museum was a museum to the sport of surfing at 16 1/2 Herlena Avenue in Santa Barbara, California. It was established by Jim O'Mahoney and opened in 1992. The museum's collection included 50 surfboards including redwood and balsa boards designed by board builders including Reynolds Yater, as well as a collection of ukuleles.

In 2017, O'Mahoney announced that the museum was closing.

References

Museums in Santa Barbara, California
Sports museums in California
Surfing museums
Museums established in 1992
1992 establishments in California
Sports in Santa Barbara, California
Surfing in California